Modjadjiskloof, formerly Duiwelskloof, is a small town situated at the foot of the escarpment in the Limpopo province of South Africa.

The village is 18 km north of Tzaneen. Surveyed in 1919 and proclaimed in 1920, it was administered by a village management board. The Sunland Baobab tree, that was located nearby, lost a large chunk of its main stem early in 2017 and the rest of the tree fell into pieces in April 2017.

The town was named in honour of the Modjadji or Rain Queen, hereditary ruler of the Balobedu people of the area and at some stage the only ruling queen in South Africa.

Name change 
The former name Duiwelskloof, Afrikaans for ‘Devil’s ravine’, was possibly given by virtue of the rugged, awe inspiring aspect, or because of the difficulty with which laden wagons trekked through it in the rainy season.

Duiwelskloof was renamed Modjadjiskloof on June 14, 2004. Unlike most name changes, Duiwelskloof kept the Afrikaans suffix "-kloof" (meaning valley) in its new name. The name "Ngoako Ramalepe" was also proposed.

References

Populated places in the Greater Letaba Local Municipality
1920 establishments in South Africa